The 1993 Chicago Marathon was the 16th running of the annual marathon race in Chicago, United States and was held on October 31. The elite men's race was won by Brazil's Luíz Antônio dos Santos in a time of 2:13:15 hours and the women's race was won by Finland's Ritva Lemettinen in 2:33:19.

Results

Men

Women

References

Results. Association of Road Racing Statisticians. Retrieved 2020-04-10.

External links 
 Official website

Chicago Marathon
Chicago
1990s in Chicago
1993 in Illinois
Chicago Marathon
Chicago Marathon